ORT Argentina is a non-government organization devoted to education. Founded in 1936, it serves the Jewish community in Argentina. There are two ORT Technical Schools in Buenos Aires, a post-secondary Institute of Technology, and a School of Integration of Technology, Management and Business. ORT Argentina employs almost 900 teachers, and its student body exceeds 6000 members. ORT Argentina is affiliated with World ORT.

External links 
ORT Argentina website
ORT Virtual Campus

Educational organisations based in Argentina
Education in Buenos Aires
Secondary schools in Argentina
Jewish educational organizations
Jewish universities and colleges
Jewish organisations based in Argentina
Jews and Judaism in Buenos Aires
1936 establishments in Argentina
Educational institutions established in 1936